The Shanghai Public Transportation Card (SPTC) ( also known as ) is a contactless card, utilizing RFID technology, which can be used to access many forms of public transport and related services in and around Shanghai.

Uses
The SPTC is a form of rechargeable cash card, and allows access to, among other things in Shanghai:

Metros
Airport maglev
Trams
Buses and trolleybuses
Ferries
Taxis
Tourist centers
Car parks
Fuel stations
Expressways
Auto repair service

As of June 2006, the card has been interchangeable with the Wuxi Tai-Lake Transportation Card, and can also be used in Suzhou.

Purchase and funding

There are five types of SPTCs:

Standard
Memorial
Mini
Personalized
Watch

Only the Standard card has a refundable deposit (20 RMB); other cards cannot be refunded, but have a lower deposit (20 RMB) and are resalable through other means. Cards can be reloaded in multiples of 10 RMB, at selected convenience stores, banks throughout Shanghai and service counters at all metro stations, or in multiples of 50 RMB in many local Metro stations (by machine; this is only possible for standard-sized cards with the exception of some machines in line 8 stations that are capable of taking most sizes). Furthermore, Android phone users can reload the cards (numbers started with U only) on the SPTC App, using NFC. Should a cardholder attempt to board a bus, ferry or the metro without sufficient funds in their card, an overdraft will be allowed if the balance (prior to the overdraft) is non-negative and the fare is less than 10 RMB.

Personalized cards are also available upon request at the Transportation Card Service Center on West Nanjing Road for a fee of 60 yuan (not inclusive of any credit).

Discounts based on the SPTC
The following discounts are available to card holders:

Interchange discount
When cardholders take a different bus within a 120-minute period from first touch-in on the previous bus, the second trip is discounted by 1 RMB, likewise the metro (while the 120-min window starts from touch-out). But no discount is applied when taking two consecutive metro journeys. For example, a trip from Jinshajiang Road/Zhenbei Road (118 Plaza) to Zhangjiang High-Technology Park costs 7 RMB in cash (Bus 94 -> Metro Line 2), but with the SPTC, the cost is reduced to 6 RMB. On some bus routes which have a one-yuan fare, trips will be free. For example, exiting from a metro station and then taking a four-digit-route bus (usually serving a residential district quite far from the station, and having one-yuan fare due to subsidy), the bus section would be free.

Metro discount
When 70 RMB is used on the same card on the Metro within one month, further metro fares are discounted 10%. This discount is applied after the Interchange discount, i.e. when both discounts are applied to a 4-RMB metro trip, the cost will be 2.7 RMB (The metro fare is 3 RMB after 1 RMB Interchange discount, then 10% discount on 3 RMB is 2.7 RMB).

Virtual transfer
For various reasons, free in-system transfer is not yet possible at some stations including the Shanghai Railway Station. While passengers with single-ride tickets must exit and re-enter at these stations to transfer between lines (and therefore re-purchase tickets), Public Transportation Card holders are charged as if the two segments were one, as long as they re-enter within 30 minutes after they exited the other station. Fares are reduced during this process.

External links
 Shanghai Public Transportation Card Co. official website
 Check your stored-value card balance – Enter your Card Number (卡 号)and Press Left button (查询)

References

Transport in Shanghai
Contactless smart cards
Fare collection systems in China